Peter of Bergamo also called Peter of Almadura (1400 ca. - 1482) was an Italian Dominican theologian.

Life
Born in Bergamo in the early 15th century, he entered the Dominican Order in his native town, and completed his studies at the University of Bologna, where he received his degree. In the Dominican House of Studies he filled the offices of Master of Students and Bachelor of the Studium.

He died in Piacenza in 1482.
The people of Piacenza venerated him as a saint, and Fr. Leandro Alberti states that miracles were wrought through his intercession. His remains were deposited in a crypt under the high altar of the chapel of St. Thomas.

Works
All of his writings that have come down to us deal with the works of Thomas Aquinas: "Index universalis in omnia opera D. Th. de Aquino" (Bologna, 1475) and "Concordantiæ locorum doct. Angel. quæ sibi invicem adversari videntur" (Basle, 1478), combined under the title, "Tabula in libros . . . cum additionibus conclusionum, concordantiis locorum et S. Script. auctoritatibus" (Venice, 1497; Rome, 1535).

In the edition of St. Thomas's works published by order of Pius V all Almadura's indices, etc. appear under the name: "Tabula aurea exim. doct. Fr. Petri de Bergamo . . . in omnes libros, opuscula et commentaria D. Th. Aquin. . . ." (Rome, 1570). This "Tabula aurea" was republished as vol. XXV of the Parma edition of St. Thomas's works (Parma, 1873).

References

 

 

1482 deaths
15th-century Italian Roman Catholic theologians
Italian Dominicans
Year of birth unknown
Year of birth uncertain